The Diocese of Pontoise (Latin: Dioecesis Pontisarensis; French: Diocèse de Pontoise) is a Latin Church ecclesiastical territory or diocese of the Catholic Church in France. Erected in 1966, the Diocese of Pontoise was split off from the Diocese of Versailles. , the diocese was a suffragan diocese in the ecclesiastical province of the metropolitan Archdiocese of Paris.

The Church Saint-Maclou became the Diocese of Pontoise's cathedral when the diocese was created in 1966. , the diocese had one priest for every 4,677 Catholics.

On Thursday 31 January 2013 Pope Benedict XVI appointed Bishop Stanislas Lalanne of the Roman Catholic Diocese of Coutances, in Coutances, France, to be Bishop of the Roman Catholic Diocese of Pontoise.

Ordinaries 
André Rousset † (9 Oct 1966 Appointed – 19 Nov 1988 Resigned) 
Thierry Romain Camille Jordan (19 Nov 1988 Succeeded – 20 Jul 1999 Appointed, Archbishop of Reims) 
Hervé Jean Luc Renaudin † (30 Nov 2000 Appointed – 18 Jan 2003 Died) 
Jean-Yves Riocreux (5 May 2003 Appointed – 15 June 2012 Appointed, Bishop of Basse-Terre)
Stanislas Lalanne (31 January 2013 Appointed – present); previously, Bishop of the Roman Catholic Diocese of Coutances, in Coutances, France

References

External links 
  Centre national des Archives de l'Église de France, L’Épiscopat francais depuis 1919, retrieved: 2016-12-24. 
Catholic Hierarchy page
Official Website page

Pontoise
1966 establishments in France